The 2014 Southland Conference baseball tournament was held from May 21 through 24.  The top eight regular season finishers of the league's fourteen teams met in the double-elimination tournament held at Bear Stadium on the campus of Central Arkansas University in Conway, Arkansas.  The event returned to a campus environment for one year before again being played at neutral Sugar Land, Texas, in 2015 and 2016.   won their first tournament championship and earned the conference's automatic bid to the 2014 NCAA Division I baseball tournament.

Seeding and format
The top eight finishers from the regular season will be seeded one through eight. They will play a two bracket, double-elimination tournament, with the winner of each bracket meeting in a single championship final.

Results

All-Tournament Team
The following players were named to the All-Tournament Team.

Most Valuable Player
Tate Scioneaux was named Tournament Most Valuable Player.  Scioneaux was a pitcher for Southeastern Louisiana, pitching 11 scoreless innings over the tournament, recording 12 strikeouts while yielding nine hits and two walks.

See also
2014 Southland Conference softball tournament

References

Tournament
Southland Conference Baseball Tournament
Southland Conference baseball tournament
Southland Conference baseball tournament